The 2012 Open de Nice Côte d'Azur was a men's tennis tournament played on outdoor clay courts. It was the 28th edition of the Open de Nice Côte d'Azur and was part of the ATP World Tour 250 series of the 2012 ATP World Tour. It took place at the Nice Lawn Tennis Club in Nice, France, from 21 May through 27 May 2012. Third-seeded Nicolás Almagro won the singles title.

Singles main draw entrants

Seeds

 Rankings as of May 14, 2012

Other entrants
The following players received wildcards into the main draw:
  Juan Carlos Ferrero
  Gaël Monfils
  Benoît Paire

The following players received entry from the qualifying draw:
  Brian Baker
  Thomaz Bellucci
  Grigor Dimitrov
  Sam Querrey

Doubles main draw entrants

Seeds

 Rankings are as of May 14, 2012

Other entrants
The following pairs received wildcards into the doubles main draw:
  John Isner /  Sam Querrey
  Nicolas Mahut /  Édouard Roger-Vasselin

Finals

Singles

 Nicolás Almagro defeated  Brian Baker, 6–3, 6–2

Doubles

 Bob Bryan /  Mike Bryan defeated  Oliver Marach /  Filip Polášek, 7–6(7–5), 6–3

References

External links
 Official website